Friedrich Doll was a German democrat and commercial traveller. He took part in the republican uprisings in Baden in 1848.  Doll also commanded a division during the Baden-Palatinate uprising of 1849.

References

German revolutionaries